Nikita Dudo (born 15 April 1995) is a Belarusian footballer who plays for Traktor Minsk.

References

External links

Profile at FC Minsk website

1995 births
Living people
Belarusian footballers
Association football midfielders
FC Minsk players
FC Energetik-BGU Minsk players
FC Molodechno players
FC Ostrovets players
FC Traktor Minsk players